Sydney Freeland (born October 10, 1980) is a Navajo filmmaker. She wrote and directed the short film Hoverboard (2012) and the film Drunktown's Finest (2014), which garnered numerous acclaims after premiering at the Sundance Film Festival. Her second film, Deidra and Laney Rob a Train debuted at Sundance and was released on Netflix in 2017.

Early life 

Freeland was born in Gallup, New Mexico, United States in 1980 to a Navajo father and a Scottish mother, and she was raised on a Navajo reservation. Freeland attended Academy of Art University in San Francisco. She is a 2004 Fulbright scholar, focusing her scholarship on a field study of indigenous peoples in Ecuador. She has a Master of Fine Arts in film, and a Bachelor of Fine Arts in computer animation. Freeland is a 2007 Disney Scholarship recipient and a 2008 Disney Fellowship semifinalist. Freeland is also a 2009 Sundance Institute Native Lab fellow.

Career 

Prior to making her first feature-length film, Drunktown's Finest, Freeland previously worked as a production assistant, as a writer and as a camera intern. Freeland worked for a number of different media companies, including The Food Network, Walt Disney, Comedy Central, and National Geographic.
Freeland directed a six-minute short, Hoverboard, utilizing Kickstarter to help fund the short. The film was inspired by Back to the Future Part II. Drunktown's Finest is her second venture into filmmaking. The 95-minute-long film is a coming-of-age story about the complex issues surrounding identity and the struggles faced by Native American people. The film's name is inspired by a controversial 20/20 segment on ABC News, which branded the town of Gallup, New Mexico as "Drunk Town, USA", after the increase of instances of alcoholism on the border of the Navajo Nation. Freeland wrote and directed Drunktown's Finest as a way to combat negative stereotypes of her home community. Freeland, who is herself a transgender woman, also directed a digital series about queer and trans women called Her Story. The series was nominated for the newly created Emmy Award category of Outstanding Short Form Comedy or Drama.

In 2014 Freeland was named a United States Artists (USA) Fellow.

On March 19, 2022, Freeland joined as a director for the upcoming superhero streaming series Echo for Disney+. In 2022, she was included in the Fast Company Queer 50 list.

Filmography 

 2008: The Migration (Short) - director
 2012: Hoverboard (Short) - producer, writer, director
 2014: Drunktown's Finest - screenwriter, director
 2016: Her Story (Web Series) - director
 2017: Deidra & Laney Rob a Train - director
 2018–2019: Grey's Anatomy (TV series) - director (2 episodes)
 2018: Heathers (TV series) - director (1 episode)
 2019: Station 19 (TV series) - director (1 episode)
 2019: Chambers (TV series) - director (1 episode)
 2019: Tales of the City (miniseries) - director (1 episode)
 2019: Fear the Walking Dead (TV series) - director (1 episode)
 2019: Impulse (TV series) - director (1 episode)
 2019: Emergence (TV series) - director (1 episode)
 2020: Nancy Drew (TV series) - director (2 episodes)
 2020: P-Valley (TV series) - director (1 episode)
 2020: The Wilds (TV series) - director (1 episode)
 2021: Rutherford Falls (TV series) - director (4 episodes)
 2021: Reservation Dogs (TV series) - director (2 episodes)
 2022: Star Trek: Strange New Worlds (TV series) - director (1 episode)
 2023: Echo (TV series) - director

Awards and nominations

See also
 List of transgender film and television directors

References

External links

American women film directors
American women screenwriters
American television directors
LGBT film directors
American LGBT screenwriters
Academy of Art University alumni
Transgender women
Navajo people
LGBT people from New Mexico
LGBT Native Americans
Living people
1980 births
People from Gallup, New Mexico
Film directors from New Mexico
Screenwriters from New Mexico
Native American screenwriters
21st-century American screenwriters
21st-century American women writers
American women television directors
20th-century Native Americans
21st-century Native Americans
20th-century Native American women
21st-century Native American women
Native American women writers